Al-Zubair Sport Club, is an Iraqi football team based in Al-Zubair, Basra, that plays in Iraq Division Two.

Managerial history
 Naeem Nouri
 Nayef Falah 
 Hussein Naseer

Famous players
Ghazi Fahad
Nawaf Falah

See also 
 2000–01 Iraqi Elite League
 2021–22 Iraq FA Cup

References

External links
 Al-Zubair SC on Goalzz.com
 Iraq Clubs- Foundation Dates
 Basra Clubs Union

Football clubs in Iraq
1971 establishments in Iraq
Association football clubs established in 1971
Football clubs in Basra
Basra